The Blotched and the Unwanted is a compilation album by Gnaw Their Tongues, released on March 3, 2010 by Hell Lies in Others. The album comprises previously unreleased compositions recorded between 2006 and 2010.

Track listing

Personnel
Adapted from The Blotched and the Unwanted liner notes.
 Maurice de Jong (as Mories) – vocals, instruments, recording, cover art

Release history

References

External links 
 
 The Blotched and the Unwanted at Bandcamp

2010 compilation albums
Gnaw Their Tongues albums